The Aeropro Eurofox is a Slovak-built two-seat light high-winged aircraft. It qualifies as a light-sport aircraft in the United States.

Design and development
Aeropro was formed in 1990, and established its factory at Nitra in Slovakia. Deliveries of the Eurofox commenced in 1990. Since 1999, two versions have been produced, the conventional gear (taildragger) and the Tricycle gear.  All versions have an enclosed cabin with two-side-by-side seats and folding wings. The Eurofox is sold in Europe as both factory complete and kit form, but is only available as a factory built aircraft in the U.S. In 2018 a group of secondary school pupils in Kinross, Fife completed building a kit as part of a science project.

From 2009, the Eurofox models were marketed in the USA and Canada by Aerotrek Aircraft of Bloomfield, Indiana. This firm has named the tri-gear version as the Aerotrek A240 and the tailwheel version as the Aerotrek A220. Latest versions can be equipped with an optional parachute recovery system.  Both versions are offered with the  Rotax 912UL and the  Rotax 912ULS engines.

Operational history
The Eurofox has been sold in several countries, with over 170 having been delivered by mid-2004. Production continues and over 500 aircraft were flying with private owners by 2017.

Variants
 Eurofox-3K Tri gear version. Sold in North America as the Aerotrek A240. It is an accepted US light-sport aircraft (LSA).
 Eurofox-2K Tailwheel version. Sold in North America as the Aerotrek A220 It is an accepted US LSA.
 Eurofox Glider Tug The tailwheel glider tug version is increasingly popular as a lightweight replacement for older types.

Specifications (Aerotrek A240)

References
Notes

Bibliography

  Specifications and images of the Eurofox series Aerotrek aircraft

External links

 Aeropro s.r.o. Archived 11 November 2018

Homebuilt aircraft
Light-sport aircraft
Glider tugs
Single-engined tractor aircraft
High-wing aircraft